Jorge Guerrero (born 17 October 1988 in Paraguay) is a Paraguayan footballer currently playing for Deportes Puerto Montt of the Primera División B in Chile.

Teams 
  Deportes Puerto Montt 2012–present

References 
 
 

1988 births
Living people
Paraguayan footballers
Paraguayan expatriate footballers
Puerto Montt footballers
Primera B de Chile players
Expatriate footballers in Chile
Association footballers not categorized by position